Benjamin Rogers (August 7, 1837 – May 16, 1923) was a merchant and political figure in Prince Edward Island. He was a member of the Legislative Council of Prince Edward Island from 1878 to 1893 and represented 1st Prince in the Legislative Assembly of Prince Edward Island from 1893 to 1897 and from 1900 to 1904 as a Liberal member. He was the ninth Lieutenant Governor of Prince Edward Island from 1910 to 1915.

He was born in Bedeque, Prince Edward Island, the son of Joseph Rogers, who had emigrated from Wales. Rogers was an export merchant. He also served as a justice of the peace and Commissioner of Small Debts. In 1862, he married Susannah Abell Hubbard. He was leader of the Opposition in the Legislative Council from 1883 to 1891 and became a member of the province's Executive Council, serving as Commissioner of Agriculture and Provincial Secretary Treasurer. Rogers died in Alberton.

His brother David also served in the provincial assembly.

External links 
  Lieutenant Governors Gallery, Prince Edward Island
The Canadian parliamentary companion, 1897 JA Gemmill

1837 births
1923 deaths
People from Prince County, Prince Edward Island
Prince Edward Island Liberal Party MLAs
Lieutenant Governors of Prince Edward Island
Prince Edward Island Liberal Party MLCs